Oluwatoyosi Ogunseye  is a Nigerian editor, journalist and presently the head of language services (West Africa) at BBC World Service. She was the former Sunday editor of The Punch Newspaper. She is also a Mandela Washington Fellow.

Early life and education
Ogunseye was born in Nigeria into the Yoruba ethnic group. She is a  graduate of University of Lagos where she received a bachelor's degree in Biochemistry; thereafter she got a post-graduate diploma in print journalism from the Nigerian Institute of Journalism. In 2010, she earned a master's degree in Media and Communications from Pan-Atlantic University. She is presently studying for her PhD in Politics and International Relations at the University of Leicester, United Kingdom.

Career
Ogunseye ventured into journalism as a second year student of the department of Biochemistry, University of Lagos when Musa Egbemana gave her a shot at reporting news happening in University of Lagos to be published on The Sun Newspaper at the time when Femi Adesina was the editor in 2004 and later moved to News Star Newspaper as a senior correspondent in 2007. In 2009, she joined The Punch Newspaper as the sub-assistant editor for news and politics till 2012. Toyosi has been an investigative journalist since 2006, before she became an editor she worked for Sunday Punch as both news editor and senior correspondent, specializing in crime on both local and international levels. She is the first and youngest female editor at The Punch Newspaper.

Ogunseye has won over 25 media awards including the health category of the CNN MultiChoice African Journalist of the Year Awards in 2011 and 2013, Nigerian Academy of Science Journalist of the Year 2013, The Future Awards Africa 2013, Child-Friendly Reporter of the Year by the Diamond Awards for Media Excellence (DAME).

References

University of Lagos alumni
Nigerian journalists
Living people
Nigerian media journalists
Yoruba journalists
CNN people
Nigerian women journalists
Year of birth missing (living people)